The following is a timeline of the presidency of Ronald Reagan from January 1, 1988, to January 20, 1989.

January 1988 
 January 2 – President Reagan co-signs the Canada–United States Free Trade Agreement.
 January 25 – President Reagan delivers the 1988 State of the Union Address  to a joint session of Congress.

February 
 February 3 – The Senate confirms Anthony Kennedy as an Associate Justice of the Supreme Court in a vote of 97–0.

March

April

May 
 May 29 – June 3 – President Reagan attends the Moscow Summit.

June 
 June 6 – President Reagan says the US and the Soviet Union have a new "dimension of trust and cooperation" thanks to his Moscow Summit trip and praises Gorbachev for the "real changes" he has brought about in the Soviet Union.

July

August 
 August 10 – President Reagan signs the Civil Liberties Act of 1988.
 August 23 – President Reagan signs the Omnibus Foreign Trade and Competitiveness Act.

September

October 
 October 13 – President Reagan signs the Family Support Act.

November 
 November 9 – President Reagan meets with President-elect Bush at the Oval Office to discuss the transition of power between the presidents.
 November 10 – President Reagan signs the Undetectable Firearms Act.

December 
 December 7 – President Reagan attends the Governors Island Summit.

January 1989 
January 4 – In a joint session of the United States Congress, the results for the electoral college are counted. In his role as President of the Senate, Vice President George H. W. Bush reads the results and declares himself as the winner of the 1988 presidential election.
 January 7 – President Reagan undergoes surgery at Walter Reed Army Medical Center.
 January 11 – President Reagan delivers his farewell address in the Oval Office.
 January 20 – President Reagan completes his two terms in office and leaves the White House for the final time as Commander-in-chief.
 January 20 – George H. W. Bush is inaugurated as the 41st president of the United States, at noon EST. Ronald Reagan, who was now former president, returns to Los Angeles to began his post-presidency.

References

External links 
 Miller Center Reagan Presidential Timeline

1988 in the United States
1989 in the United States
1988